Metachroma pellucidum is a species of leaf beetle. It is mostly found in coastal states of the United States, ranging from Texas to Florida to New York, but is also found inland to Indiana. Its length is between 3.4 and 3.8 mm.

References

Further reading

 

Eumolpinae
Articles created by Qbugbot
Beetles described in 1873
Taxa named by George Robert Crotch
Beetles of the United States